North-South Corridor may refer to:

India
North–South and East–West Corridor, a highway project in India
North-South Corridor (Ahmedabad Metro), a rapid mass transit railway system
North–South Corridor (West Bengal), a highway in Haldia Port to near Farrakka
Kolkata Metro Line 1 or North-South Metro, a mass transit rail line

Other countries
International North–South Transport Corridor, a multi-mode freight transport network in Asia and Europe
North–South Corridor, Adelaide, a road through Adelaide, South Australia
North–South Corridor, Singapore, an expressway in Singapore
North-South Corridor, a component of the Sha Tin to Central Link, a mass transit railway line in Hong Kong

See also
North South Line (disambiguation)